The Judiciary of England and Wales contains many levels, based on the court in which the judge sits. Titles are given to judges relating to their position and, in the case of knighthoods and peerages, this includes the positions they had previously held. Retired judges that sit in any court use their full name with their titles added (such as Sir or Dame, or post-nominal KC). Members or former members of the higher judiciary who are King's Counsel do not use the post-nominal letters KC.

Due to the various honours bestowed on members of the judiciary and traditions associated with the varying levels, their personal titles and forms of address often change as they progress in a judicial career.

Extant titles

Supreme Court and the Judicial Committee of the Privy Council

If there are two Justices of the Supreme Court with the same surname, then the junior Justice will take a territorial designation (i.e. "of [place]") in their title. When two or more Justices are referred at the same time in a law report, their post-nominal letters become SCJJ.

Court of Appeal

If there are two Lord Justices of the Appeal with the same surname, then the junior Lord Justice will take their first name as part of their judicial title. When two or more Lord Justices are referred at the same time in a law report, their post-nominal letters become LJJ.

High Court

If there are two Justices of the High Court with the same surname, then the junior Justice will take their first name as part of their judicial title. When two or more Justices are referred at the same time in a law report, their post-nominal letters become JJ.

Junior courts

Extinct titles

References

Judiciary of England and Wales
Titles in the United Kingdom